The Ducati 959 Panigale is a  sport bike manufactured by Ducati as the successor to the  899. The motorcycle is named after the small manufacturing town of Borgo Panigale. It was announced in 2015 for the 2016 model year.

References

External links

959
Motorcycles introduced in 2016